John Ojo (born March 2, 1990) is an American football cornerback who is currently a free agent. He was most recently a member of the Saskatchewan Roughriders of the Canadian Football League (CFL). He made his professional debut for the  Edmonton Eskimos (CFL) in 2014 after playing college football at Florida A&M University. He has also been a member of the New York Jets of the National Football League (NFL).

Early career
Ojo played high school football at Florida State University School (Florida High), where he played as both a receiver and safety. In his senior season, he finished with five touchdowns on offense and six interceptions on defense.

Starting in 2008, Ojo played college football for the Florida A&M Rattlers as a safety. After suffering a broken ankle in his first game with the Rattlers, Ojo received redshirt status and did not play for the rest of the 2008 season. He started at the free safety position for the first time in 2009. He was named to the All Mid-Eastern Athletic Conference first-team in 2011. In the second game of the 2012 season, he received a metatarsophalangeal joint sprain, also known as turf toe, which ended his season. He was again able to obtain redshirt status, preserving his final year of eligibility. Ojo played his last year with the Rattlers in 2013 as a sixth-year senior. He finished his college career with at least 131 tackles, seven interceptions, and six pass break ups.

Professional career
Ojo was eligible for the 2014 NFL Draft, but went undrafted. He was invited to try out for the Seattle Seahawks in May 2014, but was not signed to the team.

Edmonton Eskimos
John Ojo was signed by the Edmonton Eskimos (CFL) to their practice squad on October 9 and was released a month later. Ojo was again signed by the Edmonton Eskimos on April 29, 2015. On June 21, Ojo was dropped from the active roster and added to the practice squad among the final round of roster changes in the preseason. He was moved back to the active roster on June 26, and made his CFL debut in the season opener against the Toronto Argonauts on June 27, 2015, where he recorded 2 tackles and recovered a fumble. In the Eskimos' home opener against the Ottawa Redblacks, Ojo caught an interception and returned it 57 yards for a touchdown, adding four tackles. Over the course of the season, Ojo became a more prominent member of the Eskimos defense, eventually contributing 41 tackles, 8 special teams tackles and 5 interceptions, one of which he returned for a touchdown. During preseason Ojo ruptured an Achilles tendon in practice and missed the entire 2016 season. Following the 2016 season he was not re-signed by the Eskimos and became a free agent on February 14, 2017.

As of mid February 2017, Ojo's recovery was set to be completed by the end of March 2017, and he reportedly had up to eight NFL workouts lined up.

New York Jets
On April 7, 2017, Ojo signed with the New York Jets. On May 5, 2017, he was waived by the Jets.

Saskatchewan Roughriders 
Ojo returned to the CFL on March 26, 2018, when he signed with the Saskatchewan Roughriders. Ojo was released by the Riders at the start of training camp on May 22, 2018.

References

External links
Florida A&M Rattlers bio

1990 births
Living people
African-American players of American football
African-American players of Canadian football
Players of American football from Tallahassee, Florida
American football safeties
Canadian football defensive backs
Florida A&M Rattlers football players
Edmonton Elks players
New York Jets players
21st-century African-American sportspeople